Gilbert Peak is the third highest peak in the U.S. state of Utah, with an elevation of . It lies on the spine of the central Uinta Mountains, on the border between Uinta-Wasatch-Cache National Forest and Ashley National Forest in northeastern Utah, and on the border between Summit County and Duchesne County. It is the highpoint of Summit County, and lies within the boundaries of the High Uintas Wilderness.

References

External links

 
 Gilbert Peak at summitpost.com
 Gilbert Peak Data at peakbagger.com

Mountains of Utah
Features of the Uinta Mountains
Mountains of Duchesne County, Utah
Mountains of Summit County, Utah
Ashley National Forest
Wasatch-Cache National Forest